The live and video album Crossroads Guitar Festival 2019 is the sixth release in the series of Eric Clapton's Crossroads Guitar Festivals to support his rehabilitation centre in Antigua, the Crossroads Centre, documenting the 2019 performances from two concerts held on September 20 and September 21, 2019 at the American Airlines Center in Dallas, Texas. The album was released on November 20, 2020 through Warner and Rhino Records.

Track listing CD

Disc 1
"Native Stepson" – Sonny Landreth
"Wonderful Tonight" – Eric Clapton, Andy Fairweather Low
"Lay Down Sally" – Eric Clapton, Andy Fairweather Low
"Million Miles" – Bonnie Raitt, Keb’ Mo’, Alan Darby
"Son's Gonna Rise" – Citizen Cope, Gary Clark Jr.
"Lait / De Ushuaia A La Quiaca" – Gustavo Santaolalla
"I Wanna Be Your Dog" – Doyle Bramhall II, Susan Tedeschi, Derek Trucks
"That's How Strong My Love Is" – Doyle Bramhall II, Susan Tedeschi, Derek Trucks
"Going Going Gone" – Doyle Bramhall II, Susan Tedeschi, Derek Trucks
"Lift Off" – Tom Misch
"Cognac" – Buddy Guy, Jonny Lang
"Everything Is Broken" – Sheryl Crow, Bonnie Raitt
"Every Day Is a Winding Road" – Sheryl Crow, James Bay
"Retrato" – Daniel Santiago, Pedro Martins
"B-Side" – Kurt Rosenwinkel, Pedro Martins
"Baby, Please Come Home" – Jimmie Vaughan, Bonnie Raitt

Disc 2
"I Shiver" – Robert Cray
"How Long" – The Marcus King Band
"Goodbye Carolina" – The Marcus King Band
"While My Guitar Gently Weeps" – Eric Clapton, Peter Frampton
"Space for the Papa" – Jeff Beck
"Big Block" – Jeff Beck
"Caroline, No" – Jeff Beck
"Cut Em Loose" – Robert Randolph
"Hold Back the River" – James Bay
"When We Were on Fire" – James Bay
"Mas y Mas" – Los Lobos
"Am I Wrong?" – Keb' Mo'
"Slow Dancing in a Burning Room" – John Mayer
"How Blue Can You Get?" – Susan Tedeschi, Derek Trucks
"Shame" – Susan Tedeschi, Derek Trucks

Disc 3
"Is Your Love Big Enough?" – Lianne La Havas
"I Say a Little Prayer" – Lianne La Havas
"Feed the Babies" – Gary Clark Jr.
"I Got My Eyes on You (Locked & Loaded)" – Gary Clark Jr.
"Pearl Cadillac" – Gary Clark Jr.
"Tonight the Bottle Let Me Down" – Vince Gill, Albert Lee, Jerry Douglas
"Tulsa Time" – Vince Gill, Albert Lee, Jerry Douglas, Bradley Walker
"Drifting Too Far From the Shore" – Vince Gill, Albert Lee, Jerry Douglas, Bradley Walker
"Badge" – Eric Clapton
"Layla" – Eric Clapton, John Mayer, Doyle Bramhall II
"Purple Rain" – Eric Clapton, Ensemble
"High Time We Went" – Eric Clapton, Ensemble

Track listing DVD/Blu-ray

Disc 1
"Native Stepson" – Sonny Landreth
"Wonderful Tonight" – Eric Clapton, Andy Fairweather Low
"Lay Down Sally" – Eric Clapton, Andy Fairweather Low
"Million Miles" – Bonnie Raitt, Keb’ Mo’, Alan Darby
"Son's Gonna Rise" – Citizen Cope, Gary Clark Jr.
"Lait" / "De Ushuaia A La Quiaca" – Gustavo Santaolalla
"I Wanna Be Your Dog" – Doyle Bramhall II, Susan Tedeschi, Derek Trucks
"That's How Strong My Love Is" – Doyle Bramhall II, Susan Tedeschi, Derek Trucks
"Going Going Gone" – Doyle Bramhall II, Susan Tedeschi, Derek Trucks
"Lift Off" – Tom Misch
"Cognac" – Buddy Guy, Jonny Lang
"Everything Is Broken" – Sheryl Crow, Bonnie Raitt
"Every Day Is a Winding Road" – Sheryl Crow, James Bay
"Retrato" – Daniel Santiago, Pedro Martins
"B-Side" – Kurt Rosenwinkel, Pedro Martins
"Baby, Please Come Home" – Jimmie Vaughan, Bonnie Raitt
"I Shiver" – Robert Cray
"How Long" – The Marcus King Band
"Goodbye Carolina" – The Marcus King Band
"While My Guitar Gently Weeps" – Eric Clapton, Peter Frampton
"Space for the Papa" – Jeff Beck
"Big Block" – Jeff Beck
"Caroline, No" – Jeff Beck

Disc 2
"Cut Em Loose" – Robert Randolph
"Hold Back the River" – James Bay
"When We Were on Fire" – James Bay
"Mas y Mas" – Los Lobos
"Am I Wrong?" – Keb' Mo'
"Slow Dancing in a Burning Room" – John Mayer
"How Blue Can You Get?" – Susan Tedeschi, Derek Trucks
"Shame" – Susan Tedeschi, Derek Trucks
"Is Your Love Big Enough?" – Lianne La Havas
"I Say a Little Prayer" – Lianne La Havas
"Feed the Babies" – Gary Clark Jr.
"I Got My Eyes on You (Locked & Loaded)" – Gary Clark Jr.
"Pearl Cadillac" – Gary Clark Jr.
"Tonight the Bottle Let Me Down" – Vince Gill, Albert Lee, Jerry Douglas
"Tulsa Time" – Vince Gill, Albert Lee, Jerry Douglas, Bradley Walker
"Drifting Too Far From the Shore" – Vince Gill, Albert Lee, Jerry Douglas, Bradley Walker
"Badge" – Eric Clapton
"Layla" – Eric Clapton, John Mayer, Doyle Bramhall II
"Purple Rain" – Eric Clapton, Ensemble
"High Time We Went" – Eric Clapton, Ensemble

Personnel

House band 
 Eric Clapton – guitar, vocals, festival artistic producer
 Doyle Bramhall II – guitar, vocals
 Chris Stainton – keyboards
 Paul Carrack – keyboards, vocals
 Nathan East – bass
 Sonny Emory, Steve Gadd – drums
 Katie Kissoon, Sharon White – backing vocals

Production 
 Steve Woolard – supervisor from Rhino
 Lisa Glines – art supervisor
 Fred Davis – package art and design
 John "Crash" Matos – artwork
 Alan Douglas, Jacob Dennis, Joel Evendon – additional engineers
 Hannah Charlesworth, Jaqui Lang, Peter Jackson – festival executive producer
 Michael Eaton – festival and film executive producer
 Martyn Atkins – film director
 James S. Pluta – film producer
 Joel H. Weinstein – legal
 Martin Dacre – legal, film executive producer
 Bob Ludwig – mastering
 Scooter Weintraub – festival artistic producer
 David May – post audio blu-ray DVD producer
 Simon Climie – producer, mixing, festival artistic producer
 Crystal Murphy, Mike Engstrom – product manager
 Audrey Simon, John Srebalus, Julie Temkin, Kent Liu, Matthew Taoatao, Nader Tadros, Sheryl Farber, Susanne Savage – project manager

Guests 
 Billy Gibbons appears courtesy of Concord Records, a Division of Concord Music Group, Inc.
 Bonnie Raitt appears courtesy of Redwing Records.
 Buddy Guy appears courtesy of RCA Records, a Division of Sony Music Entertainment.
 Citizen Cope appears courtesy of Rainwater Recordings, Inc.
 Gary Clark Jr. appears courtesy of Warner Records.
 James Bay appears courtesy of Universal Republic Records.
 Jeff Beck appears courtesy of Rhino Entertainment Company, a Warner Music Group Company.
 Jerry Douglas appears courtesy of Rounder Records, a Division of Concord Music Group, Inc.
 Jimmy Vaughan appears courtesy of the Last Music Company.
 John Mayer appears courtesy of Columbia Records, a Division of Sony Music Entertainment.
 Keb' Mo' appears courtesy of Concord Records, a Division of Concord Music Group, Inc.
 Lianne La Havas appears courtesy of Warner Records UK, a Division of Warner Music UK Limited.
 Peter Frampton appears courtesy of Universal Music Enterprises, a Division of UMG Recordings, Inc.
 Robert Cray appears courtesy of Jay-Vee Records.
 Sonny Landreth appears courtesy of Mascot Records, a Division of Provogue Music Group.
 Tedeschi Trucks Band appears courtesy of Fantasy Records, a Division of Concord Music Group, Inc.
 The Marcus King Band appears courtesy of Fantasy Records, a Division of Concord Music Group, Inc.
 Tom Misch appears courtesy of Beyond The Groove/Kobalt Music Recordings.
 Vince Gill appears courtesy of UMG Nashville, a Division of UMG Recordings, Inc.

Charts

Weekly charts

References

2020 live albums
Eric Clapton live albums
Eric Clapton video albums